Acija Alfirević (born 12 August 1951 in Split, Croatia) is an academic, lecturer, professor, feminist, scientist, writer and literary translator.

Personal life 
She lived and lectured in London, Albany, Zagreb, Melbourne, Budapest, again London, Berlin and Cracow.

Career 
She has over 100 publications of poetry, prose, scientific/scholarly works and literary/theater translations. For her lecturing and writing work Alfirević was awarded in the USA, Australia, Hungary and former Yugoslavia.

References

External links
http://www.kwartalnik-pobocza.pl/pob32/srb/aalfirevic_srb.html

1951 births
Living people
Writers from Split, Croatia
Croatian feminists
Croatian translators
People associated with the UCL School of Slavonic and East European Studies
Literary translators